Starting line may refer to:
A position marking the beginning of a race.
The Starting Line, a pop punk band.

See also 
 Start (disambiguation)